The 2017 Villanova Wildcats football team represented Villanova University in the 2017 NCAA Division I FCS football season. They were led by first-year head coach Mark Ferrante and played their home games at Villanova Stadium. They were a member of the Colonial Athletic Association. They finished the season 5–6, 3–5 in CAA play to finish in a three-way tie for seventh place.

Schedule

Game summaries

at Lehigh

at Temple

Lafayette

at Albany

at Towson

Maine

at James Madison

Elon

Richmond

at Rhode Island

Delaware

Ranking movements

References

Villanova
Villanova Wildcats football seasons
Villanova Wildcats football